William John Hurst (c.1829 – 29 September 1886) was a 19th-century Member of Parliament in New Zealand and Mayor of Auckland.

He was born in Berwick-upon-Tweed.

In January 1868, Hurst stood in a by-election in the City of Auckland East electorate for the Auckland Provincial Council. He defeated Charles Davis 163 votes to 107. Hurst remained on the provincial council until the abolition of provincial government in 1876.

Hurst represented the Auckland West electorate from the 1879 election to 1881, and then the Waitemata electorate from the 1881 election to 1886 when he died.

His homestead, built in 1860, is located in 288 Hurstmere Road in Takapuna.

Hurst was ill and given leave from Parliament to travel home to England via San Francisco.  He died in Folkestone, Kent, England, in 1886, aged 57 years. He was survived by his wife, Mary E. Hurst.

References

1829 births
1886 deaths
Members of the New Zealand House of Representatives
Mayors of Auckland
19th-century New Zealand people
New Zealand MPs for Auckland electorates
People from Berwick-upon-Tweed
19th-century New Zealand politicians
Auckland City Councillors
Members of the Auckland Provincial Council